Sir Samuel Chapman  (27 August 1859 – 29 April 1947) was a Scottish businessman and Scottish Unionist Party politician from Perthshire.

Born in Glasgow, he unsuccessfully contested the Perth constituency in 1906 and January 1910, and the Greenock constituency in December 1910 and in 1918, but was elected as member of parliament (MP) for Edinburgh South at the 1922 general election (he was chosen as Unionist candidate for that seat over Katharine Stewart-Murray, Duchess of Atholl) and held the seat until he stepped down at the 1945 general election.

He was knighted in the 1920 New Year Honours, for "Valuable War work, especially in connection with the Perth and Perthshire Prisoners of War Fund; Public and Local services".

He died in Hove, aged 88.

References

Sources

External links 
 

1859 births
1947 deaths
Politicians from Glasgow
Scottish businesspeople
Knights Bachelor
Members of the Parliament of the United Kingdom for Scottish constituencies
People from Perthshire
Unionist Party (Scotland) MPs
UK MPs 1922–1923
UK MPs 1923–1924
UK MPs 1924–1929
UK MPs 1929–1931
UK MPs 1931–1935
UK MPs 1935–1945
Members of the Parliament of the United Kingdom for Edinburgh constituencies